Tsingy de Bemaraha Strict Nature Reserve is a nature reserve located near the western coast of Madagascar in Melaky Region. The area was listed as a UNESCO World Heritage Site in 1990 due to the unique geography, preserved mangrove forests, and wild bird and lemur populations.

National Park
The southern end of the protected area was changed into the Tsingy de Bemaraha National Park in 1997, while the northern end of the protected area remains as a strict nature reserve (Réserve Naturelle Intégrale). Borders were most recently adjusted in 2011.  

It is characterised by needle-shaped limestone formations, above cliffs over the Manambolo River. The incredibly sharp limestone formations can cut through equipment and flesh easily, which makes traversing them extremely difficult. The word "Tsingy" is derived from a local word meaning "the place where one cannot walk barefoot".

Tourism
Tourists can access the national park by road from Morondava, a town 150 km south of the park. Limited access is also possible from the town of Antsalova, which can be reached by plane from Antananarivo or Mahajanga.

See also
 List of national parks of Madagascar
 Madagascar dry deciduous forests
 Penitente (snow formation)
 Tsingy de Bemaraha National Park
 World Heritage Sites in Madagascar
 Manambolo River

References

External links

 Tsingy de Bemaraha Official Website (archived)
 UNESCO Strict Nature Reserve

National parks of Madagascar
Melaky
Geography of Madagascar
World Heritage Sites in Madagascar
Protected areas established in 1997
Madagascar dry deciduous forests
Important Bird Areas of Madagascar